Eternity is a 2016 French-Belgian romantic historical drama film written and directed by Tran Anh Hung, and based on the 1995 novel L'Élégance des veuves ("The Elegance of Widows") by Alice Ferney.

The film takes places over a century, and follows two generations of characters. The cast is led by Audrey Tautou, Bérénice Bejo and Mélanie Laurent as the focus of each time period, together with Jérémie Renier, Pierre Deladonchamps and Irène Jacob. Tran Nu Yen Khe, the director's wife, served as the narrator and art director for the film.

Cast
 Audrey Tautou as Valentine
 Bérénice Bejo as Gabrielle 
 Mélanie Laurent as Mathilde
 Jérémie Renier as Henri
 Pierre Deladonchamps as Charles
 Irène Jacob as Gabrielle's mother
 Valérie Stroh as Mathilde's mother
 Arieh Worthalter as Jules
 Philippine Leroy-Beaulieu as Valentine's mother
 Thibault de Montalembert as Valentine's father
 Tran Nu Yen Khe as Narrator

References

External links
 

2016 films
2016 romantic drama films
French romantic drama films
Belgian romantic drama films
2010s French-language films
Films directed by Tran Anh Hung
2010s French films